Bernard Stora (born 22 November 1942) is a French director and screenwriter.

Filmography

References

External links
 

1942 births
French film directors
French male screenwriters
French screenwriters
Living people
Mass media people from Marseille